2010–11 Országos Bajnokság I (men's water polo) was the 105th water polo championship in Hungary.

First stage 

Pld - Played; W - Won; L - Lost; G+ - Points for; G- - Points against; Diff - Difference; P - Points.

Championship Playoff 

Pld - Played; W - Won; L - Lost; G+ - Points for; G- - Points against; Diff - Difference; P - Points.

Third place 

|}

Final 

|}

European competition Playoff 

Pld - Played; W - Won; L - Lost; G+ - Points for; G- - Points against; Diff - Difference; P - Points.

Fifth place 

|}

Relegation Playoff 

Pld - Played; W - Won; L - Lost; G+ - Points for; G- - Points against; Diff - Difference; P - Points.

Final standing

Sources 
Magyar sportévkönyv 2012

Seasons in Hungarian water polo competitions
Hungary
2010 in water polo
2010 in Hungarian sport
2011 in water polo
2011 in Hungarian sport